The following is a list of Washington State Cougars football seasons for the football team that has represented Washington State University in NCAA competition.

Seasons

Notes

References 
General

 
 

Specific

Lists of college football seasons

Washington (state) sports-related lists